Ndriçim is a masculine Albanian given name. Notable people with the name include:

Ndriçim Babasi, Albanian politician
Ndriçim Shtubina (born 1987), Albanian footballer
Ndriçim Xhepa (born 1957), Albanian actor

Albanian masculine given names